The 1974–75 Toronto Toros season was the team's second season in Toronto, after spending their inaugural season as the Ottawa Nationals in 1972–73.  The Toros moved from Varsity Arena to Maple Leaf Gardens for the start of their second season.

Regular season

Season standings

Game log

Playoffs

San Diego Mariners 4, Toronto Toros 2

Player stats

Regular season
Scoring leaders

Goaltending

Playoffs
Scoring leaders

Goaltending

Draft picks
Toronto's draft picks at the 1974 WHA Amateur Draft.

See also
 1974–75 WHA season

References

External links

Toronto
Toronto
Toronto Toros seasons